Patrick Calvin Lynn (born April 18, 1965) is an American professional bodybuilder.

Bodybuilding career

Amateur

Professional

Competition history
 1990 NPC Nationals - 1st (MW)
 1990 IFBB World Amateur Championships - 4th (MW)
 1991 IFBB Night of Champions - DNP
 1992 IFBB Chicago Pro Championships - 13th
 1992 IFBB Ironman Pro Invitational - 12th
 1993 IFBB Ironman Pro Invitational - 14th
 1993 IFBB San Jose Pro Invitational - 8th
 1994 IFBB Ironman Pro Invitational - 12th
 1995 IFBB Florida Pro Invitational - 6th
 1995 IFBB Ironman Pro Invitational - 4th
 1995 IFBB San Jose Pro Invitational - 4th
 1995 IFBB South Beach Pro Invitational - 6th
 1996 IFBB Ironman Pro Invitational - 6th
 1997 IFBB Ironman Pro Invitational - 6th
 1998 IFBB Ironman Pro Invitational - 5th
 1999 IFBB Arnold Classic - 11th
 1999 IFBB Ironman Pro Invitational - 9th
 1999 IFBB Night of Champions - DNP
 2000 IFBB Arnold Classic - 16th
 2000 IFBB Night of Champions - DNP

Personal life

Patrick currently lives in Garden Grove, California. Since 1994, he has been the advisor and coach for professional bodybuilder Iris Kyle.

References

1965 births
African-American bodybuilders
Living people
People from Garden Grove, California
Professional bodybuilders
Sportspeople from Orange County, California
21st-century African-American people
20th-century African-American sportspeople